The N6 road is one of the 7 national roads of Senegal. It connects Tambacounda in the centre of Senegal to Ziguinchor in Basse Casamance in the south by a route which avoids traversing the Gambia. It is also known as the Route du Sud.

The road runs in a southerly direction from Tambacounda before swinging westwards to follow the southern bank of the Casamance River via Vélingara and Kolda to Ziguichor, where it connects to the N4 road.

See also
 N1 road
 N2 road
 N3 road
 N4 road
 N5 road
 N7 road
 Transport in Senegal

Road transport in Senegal